Eoghan Cahill (born 1997) is an Irish hurler who plays for Offaly Senior Championship club Birr and at inter-county level with the Offaly senior hurling team. He usually lines out as a forward after beginning his career as a goalkeeper.

Career

Born in Birr, County Offaly, Cahill is the son of former Offaly player Gary Cahill. He first came to prominence as juvenile and under age levels with Birr before progressing onto the club's senior team. He simultaneously lined out with Mary Immaculate College in the Fitzgibbon Cup and was included on that competition's Team of the Year in 2019. Cahill first appeared on the inter-county scene during a two-year stint with the Offaly minor team before a three-year stint with the under-21 team, during which time he moved from being an outfield player to goalkeeper. He made his debut with the Offaly senior hurling team during the 2018 National Hurling League.

Career statistics

Honours

Offaly
Christy Ring Cup: 2021
National Hurling League Division 2A: 2021

References

1997 births
Living people
Birr hurlers
Offaly inter-county hurlers
Hurling goalkeepers